António Crispino Lopes Tavares (born 22 November 1990), commonly known as Kisley, is a Cape Verdean professional footballer who plays as a winger.

References

External links
 
 

1990 births
Living people
Association football midfielders
Cape Verdean footballers
S.C. Lamego players
F.C. Pedras Rubras players
F.C. Felgueiras 1932 players
C.F. União players
F.C. Famalicão players
US Lusitanos Saint-Maur players
S.C. Covilhã players
Cape Verdean expatriate footballers
Expatriate footballers in Portugal
Cape Verdean expatriate sportspeople in Portugal
Cape Verdean expatriate sportspeople in France
Expatriate footballers in France